Ağa is a Turkish surname. Notable people with the surname include:

Mustapha Aga, Ottoman Empire ambassador to the Swedish Court
Osman Aga of Temesvar, Ottoman army officer
Sedefkar Mehmed Agha, Ottoman architect of the Sultan Ahmed Mosque
Suleiman Aga, Ottoman Empire ambassador to the French king Louis XIV
Silahdar Findiklili Mehmed Aga, Turkish historian
Yakup Ağa, Ottoman cavalry knight
Zaro Aga, claimed to be one of the longest-lived humans in the history of mankind
Aga, The driver of the White horse of Athens

See also
Firuz Ağa Mosque
Agha (Ottoman Empire)

Turkish-language surnames